Azi are a fictional type of human clones invented by science fiction and fantasy author C. J. Cherryh.  They appear in various books in her Alliance-Union universe. "Azi" is an acronym for "artificial zygote insemination". The subject is treated at length in Cherryh's 1989  novel Cyteen and its 2009 sequel, Regenesis.

The azi are first developed by Union just prior to the "Company War" in the early twenty-fourth century.  Although derived from human gene sequences, they are both genetically engineered and psychologically conditioned for specific occupations, such as soldiers or farmers. They are created to supplement the low human reproductive rate and bring a given settlement to self-sufficiency and economic viability.

Because of these modifications, azi are seen as an abomination by many on Earth, and this revulsion is an exacerbating factor in the start of the war between the Earth Company and Union.  During the Company War, Union produces large numbers of azi for its military and to augment its civilian population and thus stimulate economic growth.  In large measure, the azi are therefore responsible for Union forces winning a war of attrition against the Earth Company Fleet led by Conrad Mazian.

To some degree, the azi are also controversial in Union itself. As mentioned in Cherryh's books Cyteen and Regenesis, there is an abolitionist party which seeks to emancipate what it considers to be slaves, but it has little political power.

Azi are introduced to "tape" or subliminal learning at birth, which has a profound effect on their psychological development. They are less adept at handling unusual or new situations compared to normal humans; however, they are able to concentrate better. Each azi has a Supervisor, to whom he or she looks to for orders and guidance. Azi are categorized using letters from a to z, with the very brightest (on the "Rezner scale") being classed as Alphas. Azi under T class cannot read. Azi can eventually apply to become full Union citizens, and in frontier stations often become the first generation of an otherwise regular human population.

The Reseune research facility on Cyteen, the main Union planet, is central to all azi development. It has a monopoly on advanced tape design and is the legal protector of all azi in Union.  The process of selecting specific azi "psych-sets" is referred to in Cyteen sequel, Regenesis, as integrations, or designing a group of azi to complement a group of "born-man" mind sets to balance them, and thus produce a more stable society.

Azi characters are featured in the following Cherryh books:
Serpent's Reach (1980)
Downbelow Station (1981)
Port Eternity (1982)
Merchanter's Luck (1982)
Forty Thousand in Gehenna (1983)
Cyteen (1988)
Regenesis (2009)

Reception 
Gregory Pence in his 1998 book compared Cherryh's Cyteen trilogy to Ridley Scott's Bladerunner, calling them "two famous, fictional treatment" of cloning. He noted that one of the focal themes of Cyteen is the moral injustice of treating human clones as "things or slaves".

Notes
The production of azi is very similar to the normal policy of human reproduction used in Aldous Huxley's classic novel Brave New World, complete with tiered ranks based upon overall intelligence and education via "tape".

References

Sources
 
 
 
 
 
 

Alliance–Union universe
Fictional clones
Human-derived fictional species